The Airway Heights Corrections Center  is a state prison for men located in Airway Heights, Spokane County, Washington, owned and operated by the Washington State Department of Corrections.  

The facility was first opened in 1992, and has a working capacity of 2258 at minimum and medium security levels.

Notable inmates
Gerald Friend, serial rapist and kidnapper.
Nick McDonald, McCleary murderer, along with Brian Bassett, known for killing Bassett's parents and younger brother in 1995.
Evan Savoie, Ephrata murderer, known for killing Craig Sorger in 2003.

References

Prisons in Washington (state)
Buildings and structures in Spokane County, Washington
1992 establishments in Washington (state)